Vermeule is a surname. Notable people with the surname include:

Emily Vermeule, American classical scholar and archaeologist
Adrian Vermeule, American legal scholar
Blakey Vermeule
Cornelius Clarkson Vermeule I
Cornelius Clarkson Vermeule II
Cornelius Clarkson Vermeule III